The Magik Markers are an American noise rock band from Hartford, Connecticut, United States. The members, Elisa Ambrogio, Pete Nolan and Leah Quimby started the band in their basement in 2001. The band gained wider recognition after opening for Sonic Youth on their American tour in 2004. Their debut album, I Trust My Guitar, Etc... (released in vinyl only), was released in 2005 on Thurston Moore's Ecstatic Peace label. In 2006, they released A Panegyric To The Things I Do Not Understand under Gulcher Records, the Markers' first proper CD. Also in 2006, the band recorded a session for Southern records' Latitudes series, which was released as The Voldoror Dance. Leah Quimby left in May 2006 to pursue a career in ventriloquism. Various people filled in before they eventually settled as a duo composed of original members Pete and Elisa. In September 2007, the band released Boss, which was produced by Lee Ranaldo. This record was the most structured recording the Markers had released to date. Following in the wake of the Textile release For Sada Jane and the Road Pussy CD-R, the band set out to more accurately capture the sound of Magik Markers practices and jams, as opposed to the performance driven chaos of live shows.

Magik Markers have since toured the US and Europe several times. As a part of the Threelobed subscription series they released Gucci Rapidshare Download in 2008. Since their inception Peter Nolan (through his Arbitrary Signs imprint) has consistently produced limited release cdr and tape snapshot documents of the Magik Markers studio/4-track recordings and live performances, all with original handmade artwork, intended for a small audience. With the increasing ubiquity of file sharing, the entire catalogue of long out of print cdrs became readily available. Gucci Rapidshare Download was created by downloading Magik Markers cdrs from websites where they had been posted and remixing and recontextualizing the sounds with newly recorded and archival material. In the same way the Magik Markers have at times blurred the line between performer and audience live, here they have attempted to switch out the authority of the producer and creator with the perceived ownership of the listener. Though no effort of the people who originally created it, music that was intended to be temporal, such as performance, or a cdr duct taped to a piece of cardboard, has become digitally permanent and musical recordings intended to be 'permanent' pieces have become disposable through the authority of the listener. The cd cover features a christ-like Kareem Abdul-Jabbar floating to a rookie dunk shot and a faceless picture of Elisa and Pete by a dumpster, making passionate love. In addition to the Markers, longtime collaborator Ben Chasny played, plus Joshua Burkett guested and John Shaw also plays on the record. Production is co-credited to Elisa Ambrogio and Ben Chasny.

In 2008, Magik Markers played for the first time in Scotland, Austria, Ireland, Latvia and Wales. Jefferson Hack invited the Magik Markers to perform live from Studio A at Abbey Road in London, as part of Nick Kent's ShowStudio project. Magik Markers traveled to Nitra, Estonia to appear in (award winning director of Sugisball) Veiko Õunpuu's upcoming film. Peter Nolan was honored to again play drums in Jandek's band alongside Matt Heyner in London, and Elisa Ambrogio joined Six Organs of Admittance on a US and two European tours. Peter Nolan's Spectre Folk played their first UK tour, with Julie Tomlinson and John Truscinski, and Rupert Murdock. While not touring Elisa Ambrogio recorded an LP and performed with San Francisco Dirty Stealer (featuring members of Comets on Fire) and contributed short pieces of writing to various projects. In the winter of 2008 the Magik Markers recorded a new record titled Balf Quarry with Grammy winning producer and wizard Scott Colburn of Seattle. Balf Quarry was released in May 2009 on Drag City. Magik Markers have been chosen as one of the "Best New Bands" of Connecticut by Boston Phoenix Annual 50 Best Bands in America.

Discography
2002
Beep Beep (CD-R, Arbitrary Signs)
Mystery City (CD-R, Arbitrary Signs)

2003
Book as Symbol of 8 Precious Things - Hand of the Creator (CD-R, Arbitrary Signs)

2004
In the East (CD-R, Imvated)
Blues for Randy Sutherland (CD-R, Arbitrary Signs)
Live '03 (CD-R, Arbitrary Signs)
Live in Ashville (CD-R, Slippy Town)
Live Summer 2004 (CD-R, Arbitrary Signs)

2005
Tale of the Whale (CD-R)
I Trust My Guitar, Etc. (LP, Ecstatic Peace)
Feel the Crayon (CD-R, Apostasy/Arbitrary Signs / LP, Not Not Fun)
NxCxHxCx Vol. 1 (LP, no label)

2006
Inverted Belgium (LP, Hospital Productions)
For Sada Jane (CD, Textile Records)
Don and Phil (CD-R, Arbitrary Signs)
If it's Not a Ford it Sux (CD-R, Arbitrary Signs)
Road Pussy (CD-R, Arbitrary Signs)
A Panegyric to the Things I Do Not Understand (CD, Gulcher Records)
Voldoror Dance (CD, Latitudes)
Black & Blue (CD-R, Arbitrary Signs)

2007
Last of the Retsin - You Can't Fuck a Clock / Here Lies the Last of the Redstone (CD-R, Arbitrary Signs)
Castel Franco Veneto Zagreb Super Report (CD-R, Arbitrary Signs)
Magik Markers (LP, Spring Press)
M/M/D/C/ (CD-R, Arbitrary Signs)
Boss (CD, Ecstatic Peace / LP, Arbitrary Signs)
Redux aka the Real McCoy (CD-R, Arbitrary Signs)

2008
Bored Fortress, split with Vampire Belt (7", Not Not Fun Records)
Danau Blues (CD-R, Arbitrary Signs)
For Mary Meyer, the Blind Bear of the Dustbowl (CD-R, Arbitrary Signs)
Pwtre Ser (CD-R, Arbitrary Signs)
Gucci Rapidshare Download Three Lobed Recordings - September 8, 2008

2009
Baltimore Trust (CD-R, Arbitrary Signs)
Balf Quarry (LP/CD, Drag City - May 5, 2009)
Shame Mask (CD-R, Arbitrary Signs)
Я (CD-R, Arbitrary Signs)
Tour 12 (vinyl; MP3 Download,  Yik Yak  - November 30, 2009) with Sic Alps

2010
Volodor Dance (CD, Phantom Records ) - February 02, 2010

2013
Surrender to the Fantasy (LP/CD, Drag City - Nov 19, 2013)

2020
2020 (LP/CD, Drag City)

References

External links
The Magik Markers at Ecstatic Peace
PUNKCAST#1206 live video @ Death By Audio, Brooklyn, on Oct 1 2007. (RealPlayer, mp4)
Magik Markers has been chosen as one of the "Best New Bands" of Connecticut by Boston Phoenix Annual 50 Best Bands in America
The Magik Markers at Rdio

American noise rock music groups
Ecstatic Peace! artists
Musical groups from Hartford, Connecticut
Rock music groups from Connecticut